Crown Point Station is a pastoral lease that operates as a cattle station in the Alice Springs region of the Northern Territory.

Description
The ephemeral Finke River flows through the property which is bordered by Engoordina Station. The property is named after Crown Point, a pyramid shaped hill with flattened apex, near to a gorge along the Finke. The country is mostly gently undulating well covered by Mitchell grass and other fodder suitable for stock.

History
The property was established at some time prior to 1886 at which time it was owned by Messrs Willoby, Harding and Co. The station was stocked with 3,000 head of cattle, 250 horses and 200 goats.

The owner of the property in 1890 was James Cowan who, along with another man named Bullimore, was killed in a railway accident the same year. Drought struck the area in 1892 but this was followed by successive good seasons from 1893 to 1897. By 1910 the owner of the property was Horace Cowan and it was being managed by Richard Taylor.

Stock were watered by the Bloodwood Bore and 17 other wells as well as the Finke and Goyder Rivers.

Historic photographs

See also
List of ranches and stations

References

Pastoral leases in the Northern Territory
Stations (Australian agriculture)